Neacerea rufiventris is a moth of the subfamily Arctiinae. It was described by Schaus in 1894. It is found in Mexico, Bolivia and Honduras.

References

Moths described in 1894
Arctiinae